Hugo Lichte (11 April 1891 in :de:Mengede, Germany − 27 July 1963 in Berlin, Germany) was a German physicist. He did pioneering work on the theory of sound propagation in the ocean and was a leading developer of motion picture technology during the transition from silent to sound film.

Life
Hugo Lichte studied mathematics, physics and chemistry at the University of Göttingen from 1909 to 1913. He then joined the scientific staff of the “Torpedoinspektion Kiel” of the Imperial German Navy until 1919. After the end of World War I he worked at the “Signal GmbH” in Kiel and then in Berlin, starting in 1924 at the :de:Mix & Genest AG and in 1926 at the AEG.When the research institute of the AEG was founded in 1928 under the leadership of Carl Ramsauer, he was appointed head of the electro-acoustic department in Berlin. After the end of World War II he became a teacher at the :de:Lilienthal-Gymnasium (Berlin-Lichterfelde) in Berlin until 1959. In addition he was a lecturer of physics at the Free University of Berlin from 1949.

Work and achievements
Lichte promoted the understanding of physical processes and related technical developments mainly in two fields: marine acoustics. and sound film technology

He presented his pioneering work on the theory of sound propagation in the layered ocean in 1919. In his paper he was able to show that decreasing temperature and increasing pressure with depth lead to a minimum of sound velocity at mean depth. The resulting sound refraction patterns induce largely enhanced ranges of sound propagation. Urick  commented: “This paper was far ahead of its time, and is an indication of the highly advanced state of German physics in the early years of this century.“

In his later work at the AEG research institute he was a leader in the development of sound technology, in particular the techniques for the transition from silent to sound movies and for sound recognition.

Awards and honors
Oskar-Messter-Medal (in German: :de:Oskar-Messter-Medaille) 1961 of the “Deutsche Kinotechnischen Gesellschaft“, from 1972 :de:Fernseh- und Kinotechnische Gesellschaft) (Society for the Technology of Television and Cinema).

Lichtestrasse (Lichte Street) in Kiel was named in memory of Hugo Lichte on 16 February 2006.

Publications

Literature

References

1891 births
20th-century German physicists
University of Göttingen alumni
1963 deaths
Scientists from Dortmund